Helena Gilda Simão Paulo (born 24 January 1998) is an Angolan handball player for Primeiro de Agosto and the Angolan national team. She competed at the 2020 Summer Olympics, in Women's Handball.

She represented Angola at the 2017 World Women's Handball Championship in Germany.

In 2018, she represented Angola at the 2018 Women's Junior World Handball Championship where she finished as the competition's top scorer with a total 73 goals.

Achievements 
Carpathian Trophy:
Winner: 2019

Individual awards
 2019 Carpathian Trophy Top Scorer
 2022 African Women's Handball Championship MVP

References

External links
 

Angolan female handball players
1998 births
Living people
Handball players at the 2020 Summer Olympics
African Games medalists in handball
African Games gold medalists for Angola
Competitors at the 2019 African Games